"Don't Tell Me" is a song written by Buddy Miller and Julie Miller. It was originally released in 1998 by American country artist, Lee Ann Womack, on her debut album titled Some Things I Know. In 1999, it was spawned as the fourth and final single from the album and reached minor chart positions on North American country surveys.

Background
"Don't Tell Me" was composed by Buddy Miller and Julie Miller. Both composers were also credited on the album's liner notes on the background vocals for the song. However, on the single's release they were not credited. Chuck Taylor of Billboard described the song as a ballad about "dealing with lost love." The song was recorded in May 1998, during the time which Womack was recording tracks for her upcoming second studio album. Specifically, "Don't Tell Me" was cut at the House of Gain and Javelina recording studios, both of which were located in Nashville, Tennessee. The song (and Womack's second album) was produced by Mark Wright.

Critical reception
"Don't Tell Me" was given a positive reception from music critics and writers. Chuck Taylor of Billboard called its production "emotionally heart-wrenching." He also compares Womack's voice positively to that of Loretta Lynn and Tammy Wynette: "For her part, Womack does justice to the strength of the song by turning in a vocal performance that aches with longing and regret. Her heart-in-throat vocals are reminiscent of the glory days of Loretta Lynn and Tammy Wynette," he stated. Meanwhile, David Cantwell of No Depression later commented that "Don't Tell Me" was filled with "emotional anguish."

Release and chart performance
"Don't Tell Me" was first released as an album track on Womack's second record titled, Some Things I Know. The album was released in September 1998. In 1999, the song was spawned as the final single from the project. It was released via Decca Records. It spent eight weeks on the Billboard Hot Country Songs chart before reaching number 56 in December 1999. To date, it is Womack's lowest-charting Billboard single. It is also Womack's lowest-charting single on the Canadian RPM country chart, reaching the top 70 in 1999.

Track listings
CD single
 "Don't Tell Me" – 3:50
 "I Keep Forgetting" – 3:35

Charts

References

1999 singles
1998 songs
Decca Records singles
Lee Ann Womack songs
Song recordings produced by Mark Wright (record producer)